North Dakota Highway 57 (ND 57) is an east–west highway in North Dakota, running in Benson and Ramsey counties. It runs from U.S. Route 281 (US 281) west of Fort Totten to ND 20 near Camp Grafton.

Because of its proximity to Devils Lake, it has been impacted with the lake's increasing elevation; portions in and along the lake have had to be raised at least once to get the road elevation above the lake level. Despite this, the route remains vulnerable to flooding.

Route description
ND 57 begins at an intersection with US 281 in Benson County and starts east toward Fort Totten along a two-lane road. A few miles east of this intersection, the route turns northeast and enters Fort Totten. After leaving Fort Totten, ND 57 crosses Devils Lake for the first time, entering the White Horse Hill National Game Preserve upon returning to land, but leaving the preserve shortly after. The route continues to travel east, curving along the shore of the lake until reaching a small island that is home to a casino. ND 57 then curves to the north and crosses Devils Lake a second time, meeting its eastern terminus with ND 20 while crossing the lake.

All of ND 57 is included in the National Highway System, a system of highways important to the nation's defense, economy, and mobility.

Major intersections

Notes

External links

The North Dakota Highways Page by Chris Geelhart
North Dakota Signs by Mark O'Neil

057
Transportation in Benson County, North Dakota
Transportation in Ramsey County, North Dakota